Alfred Hozack Cowling (October 15, 1911 – November 18, 1996) was a Canadian politician, who represented High Park in the Legislative Assembly of Ontario from 1951 to 1971 as a Progressive Conservative member.

Background
Cowling was born in Toronto. He was one of three sons born to Eleanor May Hozack and Alfred Homer Cowling. He worked as an insurance salesman and, eventually became an executive at an insurance company in Toronto. Cowling was married to Jessie Elizabeth "Betty" Morris (1916-2008) and they had one son named William. Cowling is buried in Park Lawn Cemetery in Toronto.

Politics
His first political office was as an Alderman in the City of Toronto, where he represented Ward 7, known as "West Toronto Junction". He won three times, in the elections held in January 1949, January 1950, and December 1950. He did not run for re-election in the 1951 election.

Cowling was elected in the general election in 1951, defeating incumbent Bill Temple by 2,371 votes. Cowling was re-elected in the general elections in 1955, 1959, and 1963. He served as a backbench member of the Leslie Frost and John Robarts majority Progressive Conservative governments and, during each term in office, he served on an average of eight Standing Committees. He was defeated in the 1967 provincial general election, coming in third place and losing to Ontario's Chief Coroner, the very outspoken Morton Shulman.

References

External links
 

1911 births
1996 deaths
Politicians from Toronto
Progressive Conservative Party of Ontario MPPs